The  was held on 1 February 2004 in Kannai Hall, Yokohama, Kanagawa, Japan.

Awards
 Best Film: Vibrator
 Best Actor: Satoshi Tsumabuki – Sayonara, Kuro, Dragon Head
 Best Actress: Shinobu Terajima – Vibrator, Akame 48 Waterfalls
 Best Supporting Actor: Nao Ōmori – Vibrator, Akame 48 Waterfalls
 Best Supporting Actress: Kimiko Yo – Sayonara, Kuro, Hotel Hibiscus, Gūzen ni mo Saiaku na Shōnen
 Best Director: Ryūichi Hiroki – Vibrator
 Best New Director: Miwa Nishikawa – Hebi Ichigo
 Best Screenplay: Haruhiko Arai – Vibrator
 Best Cinematography: Norimichi Kasamatsu – Sayonara, Kuro, Akame 48 Waterfalls, My House
 Best Art Direction: Takeo Kimura – Jōhatsu Tabinikki
 Best New Talent:
Masami Nagasawa – Like Asura, Robokon
Hiroyuki Miyasako – Hebi Ichigo, 13 Kaidan
Satomi Ishihara  Watashi no Guranpa
 Special Prize: Hideo Onchi – Warabi no Kou – For this film and for his career.

Best 10
 Vibrator
 Doing Time
 Zatōichi
 Akame 48 Waterfalls
 A Snake of June
 My House
 Like Asura
 Sayonara, Kuro
 Robokon
 Hebi Ichigo
runner-up. Hotel Hibiscus

References

Yokohama Film Festival
Y
Y
2004 in Japanese cinema
February 2004 events in Japan